Zbyňov is a village and municipality in Žilina District in the Žilina Region of northern Slovakia.

History
In historical records the village was first mentioned in 1407.

Geography
The municipality lies at an altitude of 430 metres and covers an area of 7.046 km2. It has a population of about 853 people.

External links
https://web.archive.org/web/20071116010355/http://www.statistics.sk/mosmis/eng/run.html

Villages and municipalities in Žilina District